Saša Janković (born 27 April 1970) is a Serbian lawyer, journalist, human rights activist and politician who served as the National Ombudsman of the Republic of Serbia between 2007 and 2017. He resigned his post in February 2017 in order to run at the 2017 Serbian presidential election, where he came second with 16.36% of the vote. He was one of the founders and leader of Movement of Free Citizens, a centre-left political organization in Serbia before leaving it in January 2019.

Early life
Janković was born in Loznica, Serbia (then part of SFR Yugoslavia) on 27 April 1970. In his school years, he was a talented handball player, but also practiced karate and recreational archery.

In a scenario of extraordinary circumstances, Janković lost citizenship in the newly-formed Federal Republic of Yugoslavia when war broke out in Yugoslav territories due to his father having been born in Bosnia and Herzegovina. The new Yugoslav government listed Janković as a refugee when the Republic of Bosnia and Herzegovina formally declared independence from Yugoslavia. Since Janković was born in Loznica, he tried to file a complaint to the Committee of Petitions and Appeals to correct his "refugee" status, but his complaint was ignored. Due to his refugee status, Janković went into hiding for several months due to the prospect of being deported and sent to war in Bosnia and Herzegovina. Prior to this, Janković was mobilized in Yugoslav Army and spent several months in a war during the war in Croatia.

On April 1, 1993, Janković's school friend Predrag Gojković was found dead with a firearm in Janković's apartment. Janković was not in the apartment at the time of Gojković's death, but a mutual friend was there and called the police. An investigation was carried out by Yugoslavia's Ministry of Internal Affairs. It was determined that Gojković committed suicide. The investigation was re-opened on several occasions, during which Janković was interrogated and tested on a polygraph.

In an interview with Peščanik Janković talked briefly about his life in Yugoslavia in the 1990s. He sold gasoline on the streets (not from a gas station) due to the sanctions against Yugoslavia.

He graduated from the Faculty of Law of the University of Belgrade in 1996. He obtained a specialist degree from the Faculty of Political Sciences of the University of Belgrade in 2006.

Between 1994 and 1997, Janković was a journalist at Beta News Agency. After that, he was employed at the Ministry of Youth and Sports of the Government of Serbia as an associate expert. In 2000, he became a secretary of the Federal Ministry of Sports of the Government of FR Yugoslavia. In 2001, Janković became the Assistant of the Federal Minister of Sports. In 2003, he became a legal adviser at the Mission of OSCE in Serbia and Montenegro.

Ombudsman
On 29 June 2007, the National Assembly of Serbia appointed Janković to the newly established post of the National Ombudsman for a five-year term with 143 votes for. On 4 August 2012, he was re-appointed to the new five-year term with 167 votes for, one abstention, and no votes against. His re-election was supported by all parties in the Assembly.

Janković came into conflict with the Government of Serbia and Prime Minister Aleksandar Vučić in 2014 while investigating an incident in which Vučić's brother Andrej was beaten by gendarmes during a pride parade in central Belgrade. During a hearing in the National Assembly, Janković claimed that Military Security Agency broke the law during the incident. He was then attacked by the MPs of the governing Serbian Progressive Party (SNS) and the Minister of Defence Bratislav Gašić. After that, several MPs of the SNS heavily criticized the Ombudsman and called for Janković to resign claiming his actions were politically motivated. Some MPs and pro-government media outlets even claimed that Janković was responsible for suicide that a friend of Janković committed in 1993 in Janković's apartment using his pistol. OSCE and the European Commission expressed concerns about those attacks against Janković. Journalist Dragan Janjić wrote that Janković is a target of a "smear campaign" orchestrated by Vučić.

Janković clashed with the Government again in April 2015 when he claimed that Bratislav Gašić was responsible for a military helicopter crash in which 7 people have died. Janković criticized Vučić for protecting Gašić, whom Janković blamed for the accident.

Next confrontation between Janković and the Government came in May 2016 when Janković claimed that the Government is responsible for demolishing buildings in Belgrade's Savamala neighborhood under cover of the night by several dozen masked persons. Janković's report claimed that the police was ordered not to intervene during the demolition. After this, Janković was again heavily attacked by the MPs of the Serbian Progressive Party and Serbian Radical Party, who claimed that Janković is not protecting citizens, but is promoting himself instead.

In late 2016, media outlets started speculating that Janković might be a suitable candidate of the opposition at the 2017 Serbian presidential election. In November 2016, one hundred prominent public figures signed a petition to Janković calling him to run for President in 2017. He did not give any definitive answer at the time, saying that the time is not right for such a decision. This was heavily criticized by the leadership of the Serbian Progressive Party and their partners who called Janković a "politician" who only works on his political promotion and called for him to resign. In 2017, Amnesty International reported pro-government media in Serbia continued to smear independent journalists and human rights defenders, as well as the Ombudsperson's Office.

Janković officially resigned his ombudsman post on 7 February 2017 in order to run for President.

Presidential campaign, 2017
On November 25, 2016, Serbian newspaper Blic published a list of over 100 public figures in Serbia petitioned for Janković to run for president of Serbia in 2017.  In December 2016, Janković formally announced that he would run as an independent for president of Serbia in the 2017 presidential election.

This public opinion survey, carried out by CeSID showed that there are more women among the Janković's supporters. The vast majority of supporters (59%) were made by highly educated citizens. In addition, he was supported by the majority of diaspora voters.

At the election, Janković came second, behind Aleksandar Vučić, with 16.36% of the vote.

Political positions

Kosovo
In an interview with Novi Magazin, Janković was asked whether Serbia would recognize Kosovo as a state under any conditions. He replied that he "won't put a signature on the independence of Kosovo," adding that "I don't even think anyone would ask that of me." Janković criticized the idea of a partition of Kosovo, calling it dangerous. He also criticized the Kosovska Mitrovica train incident, saying that "I won't allow the military or security services to play with shiny trains to present to the media, while the consequences of that game are suffered by Serbs in Kosovo, especially in the enclaves."

Awards
In March 2015, Janković was awarded French National Order of Merit in the rank of Chevalier (Knight). He was named the “Person of the Year” by Mission of OSCE in Serbia (2011) and by news magazine Vreme (2015).

References

External links

 
 Official page of the presidential candidate Saša Janković
 Official Serbian Ombudsman page

|-

|-

1970 births
Living people
People from Loznica
Ombudsmen
University of Belgrade Faculty of Law alumni
Serbian democracy activists
Serbian human rights activists
Knights of the Ordre national du Mérite
Candidates for President of Serbia
Movement of Free Citizens (Serbia) politicians